is a Japanese former professional baseball third baseman in Nippon Professional Baseball. He played for the Hiroshima Toyo Carp from 1990 to 1999, Yomiuri Giants from 2000 to 2005 and the Seibu Lions / Saitama Seibu Lions from 2006 to 2009.

References

External links

1970 births
Hiroshima Toyo Carp players
Japanese baseball coaches
Japanese baseball players
Living people
Nippon Professional Baseball coaches
Nippon Professional Baseball first basemen
Nippon Professional Baseball third basemen
Saitama Seibu Lions players
Seibu Lions players
Baseball people from Tokyo Metropolis
People from Higashiyamato, Tokyo
Yomiuri Giants players